Karim El Hany (born 12 January 1988) is a French footballer who currently plays as a midfielder for Mouloudia Oujda. Born in Sartène France, El Hany first started playing for Gazélec Ajaccio at the age of 19 before moving to rivals AC Ajaccio.

Club career

GFCO Ajaccio 
El Hany's first experience in professional football was at the age of 19 when he joined Championnat de France amateur side GFCO Ajaccio. his first season as a youth started slowly with just 1 appearance all season but in the 2008-09 season he got a taste for first team football playing 18 games and scoring once. In his final season to be at GFCO Ajaccio, El Hany played 33 from 34 games and scored 7 times helping his team to 2nd place in the CFA groupe B.

AC Ajaccio 
At the start of the 2010-11 season, El Hany secured a free transfer to rival team AC Ajaccio. In his first season at AC Ajaccio, El Hany started a total of 11 games whilst coming on as a substitute a further 13 times. Although he didn't score, he did help Ajaccios promotion back to the Ligue 1. El Hany also played a further 5 games for AC Ajaccio in the Coupe de France and scored once.

Career statistics
(correct as of 3 August 2011)

References 

1988 births
Living people
French footballers
Sportspeople from Corse-du-Sud
AC Ajaccio players
R.W.D.M. Brussels F.C. players
RWS Bruxelles players
MC Oujda players
Botola players
Ligue 2 players
Ligue 1 players
Challenger Pro League players
French expatriate footballers
Expatriate footballers in Belgium
Association football forwards
Footballers from Corsica